Nuzak may refer to:
 Anders Wollbeck, a Swedish musician
 Fluoxetine hydrochloride, an antidepressant